PGL may refer to:

Paraganglioma, a type of rare neuroendocrine neoplasm
 The succinate dehydrogenase SDHD (previously known as PGL1) and SDHC (previously PGL3)
Persistent generalized lymphadenopathy
PGL (company), UK
Polish Aviation Group (Polish: Polska Grupa Lotnicza)
Professional Gamers League, former US electronic sports league
Projective linear group, in mathematics